The 2009 Houston Cougars football team, also known as the Houston Cougars, Houston, or UH, represented the University of Houston in the 2009 NCAA Division I FBS football season. It was the 64th year of season play for Houston. The team was coached by second year head football coach, Kevin Sumlin. The team played its home games at Robertson Stadium, a 32,000-seat stadium on campus in Houston. The Cougars finished the season 10–4, 6–3 in CUSA play, were co–champions of the west division and lost to East Carolina 38–32 in the CUSA Championship Game. They were invited to the Armed Forces Bowl where they lost to Air Force 47–20. It was the second consecutive year that they had played Air Force in the Armed Forces Bowl.

Previous season
The 2008 season was head coach Kevin Sumlin's inaugural season with the Cougars.  The Cougars finished 3rd in Conference USA's West division with a 6–2 conference record and 8–5 overall record.  The Cougars ended their season with a win against the Air Force Falcons in the Armed Forces Bowl. This marked the first time since 1980 that the Cougars won a bowl game, and ended their eight-game losing streak.

In addition, the Cougars defeated two nationally ranked teams: #23 East Carolina and #25 Tulsa; the former of which was on the road.  It was the first time the Cougars had defeated a ranked opponent in an away game since the 1984 season.  Another first since then was the defeat of two nationally ranked teams in one season.

At the conclusion of the post-season, offensive lineman Sebastian Vollmer graduated from Houston, and was drafted by the New England Patriots in the second round of the 2009 NFL Draft. Phillip Hunt was also signed to the Cleveland Browns.  Houston's starting quarterback Case Keenum held the number two rank for passing yards in the NCAA.

Preseason

Spring practices
The Cougars held Spring practices from March 24 to April 18, 2008.  On April 4, the team played a public scrimmage.  The Cougars' annual Red-White Game, which was the conclusion of the Spring practices, was abruptly halted after the first ten minutes of gameplay due to rainy weather conditions.

Recruiting

Coaching staff

Schedule

Denotes the largest crowd to have watched a football game at Robertson Stadium in its current capacity, and the largest Houston ever hosted on-campus.  This was later broken the next season.

Game summaries

Northwestern State

The Northwestern State Demons of the Southland Conference traveled to Houston to meet with the Cougars for the first time in school history.  Head coach Bradley Dale Peveto, a former Houston defensive coordinator and assistant head coach, led the Demons in his first game ever. With the first five touchdowns for Houston resulting from the Cougars' first five possessions, the Demons' first first down occurred only after the score was 28–0 in the home team's favor. With the game well in hand for the Cougars in the third quarter, starting quarterback Case Keenum was rested for the rest of the game.

Oklahoma State

The Cougars traveled to Boone Pickens Stadium in Stillwater to face Oklahoma State (ranked 5th in the AP football poll and 6th in the Coaches' Poll).  Houston came out of the gate with a touchdown and field goal in the first quarter, but Oklahoma State responded with a drive to the endzone in the beginning of the second quarter.  However, Houston parlayed an onside kick into two more touchdowns to close the half.  In the third quarter, Oklahoma State dominated, with touchdowns coming from rushes by Keith Toston and Beau Johnston.  A punt return for 82 yards by Dez Bryant yielded another touchdown for Oklahoma State.  However, the Cougars clawed back in the final quarter, with the help of a Case Keenum pass that turned into a tipped ball caught by Bryce Beall, and a Zac Robinson interception that was returned for a touchdown.  Following the win, Houston was launched into the #21 ranked spot in the AP Poll, which marked the first time since 1991 in which the Cougars had been ranked in the top 25.

Texas Tech

Houston faced-off against former Southwest Conference rivals, the Texas Tech Red Raiders, for the first time since the demise of that athletic conference following the 1995 season.  The game also marked the first time that Houston hosted Texas Tech on-campus, as the Astrodome had served as the previous home for the Cougars during that era.  During Houston's bye the week prior, AP and Coaches' Poll voters ranked the Cougars ahead in the polls to #17 and #23 respectively.  It was the first time in eighteen years that Houston entered a game as a nationally ranked team.

Although attempting to recover from a loss to #2 Texas the week before, Texas Tech's starting quarterback Taylor Potts had passed for a career record of 46 passes for 420 yards.

The game received heavy media coverage, and was broadcast nationally on ESPN2.  After a complete sell-out of public game tickets by Houston athletics, 1,500 student guest tickets went on sale the Monday morning before the game.  With students arriving around midnight to await box office opening, all student guest passes were gone within three hours. The game marked a record attendance of 32,114 at Robertson Stadium in its current seating capacity including an appearance by U.S. Senator for Texas and gubernatorial candidate Kay Bailey Hutchison. Following a similar phenomenon from Monday, 5,500 students were allowed general admission into the game for no charge on gameday.  Houston businessman Jim McIngvale donated a 9'x16' LED screen displaying the ESPN2 broadcast for use in the stadium parking lot during the game to accommodate the remainder of the University of Houston's 37,000 student enrollment who were unable to gain entry.  UH Alumnus Hakeem Olajuwon facilitated the pre-game coin toss.  Fellow alumnus and former Cougars basketball coach Clyde Drexler was also in attendance.

Although prior to the win, Texas Tech had been victors of the previous five meetings, the all-time record between the teams was updated to 18–10–1 with Houston leading.  The Cougars' record improved to 3–0.

UTEP

Following the home victory, Houston went on the road to El Paso, Texas to face conference foe UTEP for the seventh time in school history.  Having moved five spots up to #12 in the AP Poll prior to the game, the undefeated Cougars were heavily favored to win.  UTEP's record was 1–3, and were coming off a 64–7 loss to Texas.  Despite a remarkable attempt by Houston, where Case Keenum threw for a career record of 536 passing yards with 5 touchdowns, the Cougars could not contain UTEP's run-style offense.  UTEP running back Donald Buckram ran for a career-high of 262 yards against Houston as the Miners completed a 58-41 upset.  Houston's all-time record against UTEP fell to 3–4.  The Cougars would fall completely out of both the AP Poll and Coaches' Poll top 25 rankings, but continued to receive votes.

Mississippi State

Houston attempted to begin rebuilding after the UTEP upset in Starkville, Mississippi meeting with the Mississippi State Bulldogs.  It was the fifteenth meeting between the two teams, where the Cougars held an 8–6 record over the Bulldogs who first competed against each other in 1956.  The last time Mississippi State defeated Houston was in 1972, as the Cougars won the last two meetings.  The game was nationally televised on ESPNU.  The Bulldogs were able to contain Houston's offense to 17 points in three quarters and enter the fourth quarter in a tie game.  The Cougars offense scored two touchdowns in rapid succession with six and four minutes to go in the game, and then conceded a touchdown run to Anthony Dixon with 1:22 to play.  However, the Cougars were able to recover a Mississippi State onside kick attempt and went on to win the game.  Following the win, the Cougars regained a place in the top 25 list for both the AP Poll and Coaches' Poll with a ranking of #23.

Tulane

Houston completed its three-game road trip in New Orleans, Louisiana against the Tulane Green Wave.  With a record of 5-1 after completing the game, Houston was off to the best start of a season since 2003. Having competed against each other for the first time in 1968, the Cougars held a 10-4 all-time record against Tulane, and had won their last seven games against the Green Wave.  Heavily favored Houston started off the game slowly against Tulane's pass defense which stood as the best in Conference USA at the time, and the Cougars went into halftime leading only 9-6 against the Green Wave.  However, in the second half the offense exploded for 20 unanswered points in the third quarter and 15 points in the fourth while conceding 10, and Houston left the Superdome a 44-16 winner.  Following the game, Houston rose to #17 in the AP Poll and to #18 in the Harris and Coaches' Polls.  When the initial BCS ranking came out the following Sunday Houston secured the #17 spot, marking the first week the Cougars were ranked in the BCS poll.

SMU

The Cougars returned to play in Houston for the first time since its September victory over Texas Tech to face the SMU Mustangs in their homecoming game.  Another former Southwest Conference opponent, SMU was coached by second-year head coach June Jones.  It was the 25th meeting between the teams, where Houston held a 15-9-1 record in the all-time series.  The game was nationally televised on the CBS College Sports network.  Houston took advantage of two SMU turnovers early in the game and utilized an effective running game to take a 24-3 lead into halftime.  SMU's turnover issues continued into the second quarter as Houston kept going to freshman Charles Sims on the ground.  Sims finished the game with 15 carries for 105 yards and two touchdowns.  Case Keenum finished with comparatively light duty, only collecting 233 yards and two touchdowns on 36 completions as Houston dispatched SMU 38-15.  Following the victory, Houston moved up to #15 in the AP poll and to #16 in the Coaches' and Harris polls, but moved down to #18 in the BCS poll.

Southern Miss

The Cougars continued the 2009 season with a Halloween showdown versus conference rival Southern Miss.  Houston came into the game at 7-1 and on its best start since 1990, in the days of the Southwest Conference.  The two teams last met in the 2006 Conference USA Football Championship.  The game turned into a shootout early as neither defense proved able to slow down quarterbacks Martevious Young and Case Keenum.  Southern Miss led early 13-7 at the end of the first quarter, but Houston collected 23 points on three touchdowns and a returned blocked extra point to go into halftime leading 30-22.  The game slowed down somewhat in the second half as Houston extended the lead to 40-22 in the fourth quarter, but Southern Miss's Young led the Golden Eagles to a late game comeback, scoring three touchdowns in eight minutes to tie the game at 43 with only 57 seconds left.  However, Houston's Keenum calmly led the Cougars down the field in a scene reminiscent of the Texas Tech game and needed only 36 seconds to complete a game-winning touchdown drive.  Keenum passed for a career record 559 yards that day.  Houston escaped out of Robertson Stadium that day with a 50-43 victory.  The following day, Houston found itself ranked 13th in the AP poll, 15th in the Coaches', 14th in the Harris, and 15th overall in the BCS poll, an improvement in all rankings.

Tulsa

The 8-1 Cougars took to the road the following week to take on the ever-dangerous Tulsa Golden Hurricane.  Houston came into the game with an 18-16 record all time versus Tulsa.  The game took mostly the form of the previous game against Southern Miss, where neither team's defense were effective against potent passing attacks.  The Cougars utilized a strong first half from wide receiver James Cleveland to go into halftime leading 24-21.  Houston's defense nearly collapsed completely in the third quarter as Tulsa QB G.J. Kinne tore the Cougars apart in the air and on the ground, scoring three individual touchdowns in the third quarter.  Houston's offense were able to keep up mostly with Tulsa, and the quarter ended with a 38-34 score favoring Tulsa.  Tulsa's defense solidified somewhat in the fourth quarter, holding Houston out of the end zone on a goal line stand early and making Houston settle for a 26-yard field goal with eight minutes to play.  Tulsa's offense then churned out one last scoring drive with three and a half minutes to play to bring the score to 45-37.  Houston needed a touchdown with a two-point conversion on its last drive to tie the game.  Keenum again led the Cougars down the field and threw a third touchdown pass to James Cleveland to bring UH to 45-43, but Keenum was sacked on the two-point conversion attempt.  With only 21 seconds to play, Houston attempted a last gasp onside kick attempt which was successfully recovered by Tim Monroe.  Keenum quickly brought the offense 27 yards down the field in three plays and then retired to give walkon freshman kicker Matt Hogan a chance to win the game on his leg.  It was the first time Hogan had tried a field goal longer than 50 yards, but he booted the field goal down the middle as Houston escapes being upset once again, winning 46-45.  The victory was the first one by game-winning field goal in school history.  After the thrilling comeback, the Coaches' poll moved Houston to #12, the Harris to #13, and the BCS ranking remained unchanged at #15.

Central Florida

With visions of a possible top 10 ranking in the near future, the 9-1 Cougars traveled to Orlando, Florida to play the Knights of Central Florida.  UCF had met Houston only two times before, each team winning a game.  The game began as though heavily favored Houston would win in less dramatic fashion than normal, easily taking a 10-0 lead to the second quarter.  However, in the second quarter UCF began going to the ground and exploiting serious weaknesses in the run defense exposed by games against Texas Tech and UTEP.  UCF ground out yards and jealously kept the ball out of the hands of the dangerous Houston offense.  Unable to cope with the punishing ground game, Houston scored only one kickoff return touchdown in the next two quarters and UCF took a 23-17 lead into the fourth quarter.  UCF scored two more touchdowns, one rushing and one passing, early in the fourth to move to 37-20 while grinding down clock and keeping the ball in UCF possession.  Houston's offense broke out only with three and a half minutes to play by way of a touchdown pass, and then another one with only ten seconds to play to bring the game to 37-32.  However this time, Houston would not recover the last second onside kick and UCF completed the upset.  The victory by UCF was the first against a Top 25 ranked opponent in school history.  After the loss, Houston dropped far in the polls to #22 in the Coaches' and #23 in the Harris, with the BCS dropping Houston further to #24.  Not only had any vision of a BCS Bowl for the Cougars disappeared, even the possibility of a conference title began to come into doubt as the loss put SMU in the lead for the CUSA West division title.

Memphis

Houston returned to Robertson Stadium to lick their wounds of the previous week. The 1-9 Memphis Tigers were in town.  Houston struck first, quickly, and often in the first half; Keenum completed 29 passes for 405 yards and 5 touchdowns before retiring just after halftime.  Houston took a commanding 42-14 lead into halftime, and Houston tacked on two more touchdowns by way of a touchdown pass from backup quarterback Cotton Turner and a Charles Sims touchdown run to easily win 55-14.  Memphis's two touchdowns came by way of running back Curtis Steele, indicating Houston had not fixed their major ground game issues.  With the victory and a loss by SMU to Marshall earlier in the day, Houston ended the week as leader of CUSA West with only one game remaining.  Houston's ranking recovered slightly the following day; the Coaches' and Harris polls placed the Cougars at #20 and the BCS at #23.

Rice

The final game of the season was a Thanksgiving renewal of the rivalry with Rice, with the two teams playing for the Bayou Bucket.  Houston came into the game with a 27-9 record versus the crosstown Owls.  Much like the Memphis game, Houston's offense scored at will versus the Rice defense.  Case Keenum scored only two touchdowns on 323 yards passing before hitting the showers at halftime, his Cougars leading 59-0.  The game slowed down somewhat in the third quarter, and Houston extended its lead to 65-0 before Houston's reserves conceded two touchdowns.  Houston's reserves added two touchdowns of their own, and the Cougars defended the Bayou Bucket 73-14.  The 73 points was the most scored by any team in the 2009 NCAA Division I FBS season.  The victory also sealed a CUSA West title for the Cougars - though SMU won earlier in the day, Houston owned the tiebreaker by way of defeating the Mustangs in October.  Houston's ranking improved two spots in all polls; the Coaches' and Harris polls placed the Cougars at #18 and the BCS at #21.

East Carolina (C-USA Championship)

The Cougars, representing CUSA West, traveled to Greenville, North Carolina for the Conference USA Championship against defending champion East Carolina.  ECU employed the same strategy used by conference mates UTEP and UCF in their upsets of the Cougars - run the football often and grind the clock.  Alongside that, the ECU run defense stopped the Cougar running game completely cold (only 30 yards total rushing), leaving Houston to rely on the skills of Case Keenum to carry them through.  The Cougar passing game did have success for a while as Houston led at halftime 19-14, but the Pirate defense became more and more stifling as the day wore on, finally Keenum threw two interceptions in the fourth quarter which after translating to two ECU rushing touchdowns put the game out of reach.  ECU became the first school to successfully defend a Conference USA title by a score of 38-32.  With this loss, the Cougars dropped to #25 in the Harris and Coaches' polls and out of the BCS poll completely.

Rumors persisted that Coach Sumlin was leaving for a position at Texas A&M. He continually denied those rumors which were proved true. The rumors of Sumlin leaving deeply affected how the Cougars played and it contributed to its loss.

Later in December, it was announced Houston accepted an invitation to play in the 2009 Armed Forces Bowl.

Air Force (Armed Forces Bowl)

The 2009 Armed Forces Bowl was a rematch of the previous year's matchup between Houston and Air Force, which was itself a rematch of a 2008 regular season game.  Houston won the bowl the previous season.

Houston's inability to stop a running game was exploited worst of all by Air Force, who features a running-heavy triple offense.  Air Force running backs marched up and down the field and chewed up 41 minutes of game time while the Air Force's pass defense, statistically #1 in the nation, sat back and intercepted Case Keenum's passes seemingly at will - Air Force collected six interceptions in all, a career worst for Keenum.  Air Force led comfortably 24-6 at halftime and Houston proved little resistance in the second half, losing in all 47-20.  Houston had now lost nine of ten bowl games dating back to 1980.  The loss removed Houston from every end-of-season poll.

Poll rankings

Depth chart

References

Houston
Houston Cougars football seasons
Houston Cougars football